"Girl, You'll Be a Woman Soon" is a song written by American musician Neil Diamond, whose recording of it on Bang Records reached number 10 on the US pop singles chart in 1967. The song enjoyed a second life when it appeared on the 1994 Pulp Fiction soundtrack, performed by rock band Urge Overkill. Other versions have been recorded by Cliff Richard (1968), Jackie Edwards (1968), the Biddu Orchestra (1978), and 16 Volt (1998).

Neil Diamond version
The song first appeared on Diamond's album Just for You. The mono and stereo versions of this song differ slightly. On the mono "Just For You" LP as well as on the 45, the strings do not come in until the second verse. It also has a slightly longer fade. The stereo "Just For You" LP version has a shorter fade and the strings come in on the first chorus. The lyrics describe a narrator romantically interested in a young woman whose friends and family disprove of him ("They never get tired of putting me down") while he urges the woman to reach her own conclusions about him ("Don't let them make up your mind"). 

Billboard described the single as a "sure-fire chart topper," stating that an "easy rhythm backs a soulful reading of a compelling lyric."  Cash Box called the single a "rhythmic, mid-tempo ballad that should see lots of Top 40 play."

Track listing
7-inch single
 "Girl, You'll Be a Woman Soon"		
 "You'll Forget"

Charts

Cliff Richard version

Cliff Richard covered the song as the B-side to his 1968 single "I'll Love You Forever Today, which was featured in the movie Two a Penny.

Track listing
7-inch single
 "I'll Love You Forever Today" – 3:06
 "Girl, You'll Be a Woman Soon" – 3:03

Charts

Urge Overkill version

American alternative rock band Urge Overkill recorded a cover of the song for their second extended play (EP), Stull (1992). This version would later appear in Quentin Tarantino's 1994 film Pulp Fiction. Issued as a single in late 1994, this version achieved some chart success both domestically and internationally, peaking at number one in Iceland and reaching the top 20 in Flanders, France, and New Zealand. On the US Billboard Modern Rock Tracks chart, the song peaked at number 11.

Track listing
CD single
 "Girl, You'll Be a Woman Soon" – 3:10
 "Bustin' Surfboards" (by the Tornadoes) – 2:27
 "Bullwinkle Part II" (by the Centurians) – 2:18

Charts

Release history

References

1967 singles
1994 singles
1995 singles
Cliff Richard songs
Neil Diamond songs
Urge Overkill songs
Songs written by Neil Diamond
Bang Records singles
1967 songs
Song recordings produced by Norrie Paramor
Columbia Graphophone Company singles
MCA Records singles
Rock ballads
Number-one singles in Iceland